Dyadobacter arcticus  is a Gram-negative, psychrotolerant, rod-shaped, aerobic and non-motile bacterium from the genus of Dyadobacter which has been isolated from Arctic soil from Svalbard Archipelago in Norway.

References

External links 
Type strain of Dyadobacter arcticus at BacDive -  the Bacterial Diversity Metadatabase

Cytophagia
Bacteria described in 2013
Psychrophiles